This is a list of minerals named after people. The chemical composition follows name.

A
Abelsonite: C31H32N4Ni – American physicist Philip Hauge Abelson (1913–2004)
Abswurmbachite: Cu2+Mn3+6O8SiO4 – German mineralogist Irmgard Abs-Wurmbach
Adamite: Zn2AsO4OH – French mineralogist Gilbert Joseph Adam (1795–1881)
Agrellite: NaCa2Si4O10F – English optical mineralogist Stuart Olof Agrell (1913–1996)
Agricolaite: K4(UO2)(CO3)3 – German scholar Georgius Agricola (1494–1555)
Aheylite: Fe2+Al6[(OH)4|(PO4)2]2·4H2O – American geologist Allen V. Heyl (1918–2008)
Albrechtschraufite: Ca4Mg(UO2)2(CO3)6F2·17H2O – Albrecht Schrauf (1837–1897), professor of mineralogy, University of Vienna
Alexandrite (variety of chrysoberyl): – Tsar Alexander II of Russia (1818–1881)
Alforsite:  Ba5Cl(PO4)3 – American geologist John T. Alfors (1930–2005)
Allabogdanite: (Fe,Ni)2P – Alla Bogdanova, Geological Institute, Kola Science Centre of Russian Academy of Sciences
Allanite series: sorosilicate – Scottish mineralogist, Thomas Allan (1777–1833)
Alloriite: Na5K1.5(Al6Si6O24)(SO4)(OH)0.5 * H2O –  Italian mineralogist Roberto Allori (b. 1933)
Almeidaite: crichtonite group (metal titanates); Brazilian geologist Fernando Flávio Marques de Almeida (1916–2013)
Andersonite: Na2Ca(UO2)(CO3)3·6H2O – Charles Alfred Anderson (1902–1990), United States Geological Survey
Andradite: Ca3Fe2Si3O12 – Brazilian statesman, naturalist, professor and poet José Bonifácio de Andrade e Silva (1763–1838)
Ankerite:  CaFe2+(CO3)2 – Austrian mineralogist Matthias Joseph Anker (1771–1843)
Anthonyite: Cu(OH)2·3H2O – John Williams Anthony (1920–1992), professor of mineralogy, University of Arizona
Argandite: Mn7(VO4)2(OH)8 – Swiss geologist Émile Argand (1879–1940) 
Arfvedsonite:  Na3(Fe,Mg)4FeSi8O22(OH)2 – Swedish chemist Johan August Arfwedson (1792–1841)
Armalcolite:  (Mg,Fe2+)Ti2O5 – American astronauts ARM Neil Armstrong, AL Buzz Aldrin and COL Michael Collins
Armbrusterite:  K5Na3Mn3+Mn2+14[Si9O22]4(OH)10·4H2O – Swiss crystallographer Thomas Armbruster (born 1950), University of Bern
Armstrongite: CaZr[Si6O15]·3H2O – American astronaut Neil Armstrong (1930-2012)
Arthurite:  CuFe23+[(OH,O)|(AsO4,PO4,SO4)]2·4H2O – British mineralogists Arthur Edward Ian Montagu Russell and Arthur W. G. Kingsbury
Atencioite:  – Daniel Atencio, professor of mineralogy, Geoscience Institute, University of São Paulo
Avicennite: Tl2O3 – Persian scholar and physician Avicenna (980–1037)

B
Backite (IMA2013-113)
Bandylite (6.AC.35)
Baumhauerite: Pb3As4S9 – German mineralogist Heinrich Adolph Baumhauer (1848–1926)
Bazzite: Be3(Sc,Fe)2Si6O18 – Italian engineer Alessandro E. Bazzi
Benstonite: Ba6Ca6Mg(CO3)13 – Orlando J. Benston (1901–1966), an ore dressing metallurgist with the University of Illinois
Bentorite: Ca6(Cr,Al)2(SO4)3(OH)12·26H2 – Israeli geologist Yaakov Ben-Tor (1910-2002)
Berthierite: (Fe,Sb)2S4 – French geologist and mining engineer Pierre Berthier (1782–1861)
Bertrandite: Be4Si2O7(OH)2 – French mineralogist Emile Bertrand (1844–1909)
Berzelianite: Cu2Se – Swedish chemist Jöns Jakob Berzelius (1779-1848)
Berzeliite: NaCa2Mg2(AsO4)3 and manganberzeliite – Swedish chemist Jöns Jacob Berzelius (1779–1848) 
Bettertonite: [Al6(AsO4)3(OH)9(H2O)5]・11H2O  – John Betterton (b. 1959, London), museum geologist and mineralogist at Haslemere Educational Museum in Surrey, England 
Beudantite: PbFe3+3(AsO4)(SO4)(OH)6 – François Sulpice Beudant (1787–1850) French mineralogist, University of Paris, Paris
Bideauxite (3.DB.25)
Bilibinskite: Au2Cu2PbTe2+ – Soviet geologist Yuri A. Bilibin (1901–1952)
Biringuccite: Na2B5O8(OH) – Vannoccio Biringuccio (1480–1538/9), Italian alchemist, metallurgist
Bixbite: Be3(AlMn)2Si6O18 – American mineralogist Maynard Bixby; deprecated to red beryl to avoid confusion with bixbyite
Bixbyite: (Fe,Mn)2O3 – American mineralogist Maynard Bixby
Blödite: Na2Mg(SO4)2 – German chemist Carl August Blöde (1773–1820)
Blossite: αCu2V2O7 – mineralogist Donald F. Bloss, Virginia Polytechnic Institute
Bobdownsite (discredited)
Bobfergusonite: Na2Mn2+5Fe3+Al(PO4)6 – Robert Bury Ferguson, University of Manitoba
Boehmite: γ-AlO(OH) – Bohemian-German chemist Johann Böhm  (1895–1952)
Bornite: Cu5FeS4 – Austrian Mineralogist Ignaz von Born (1742–1791)
Bournonite: PbCuSbS3 – French crystallographer and mineralogist Jacques Louis de Bournon (1751–1825)
Braggite: PtS – the first mineral characterized by X-ray analysis. William Henry Bragg (1862–1942) and his son, William Lawrence Bragg (1890–1971)
Brandtite: Ca2Mn2+(AsO4)2 – Swedish chemist Georg Brandt (1694–1768)
And parabrandtite
Breithauptite: NiSb – Saxon mineralogist Johann Friedrich August Breithaupt (1791–1873)
Brewsterite series (9.GE.20)
Briartite: Cu2(Zn,Fe)GeS4 – Belgian geologist Gaston Briart
Brookite: TiO2 – English mineralogist Henry James Brooke (1771–1857)
Brucite: Mg(OH)2 – American mineralogist Archibald Bruce (1777–1818)
Buddingtonite: NH4AlSi3O8 – American Petrologist Arthur Francis Buddington (1890–1980)
Burnsite: KCdCu2+7(SeO3)2O2Cl9 – Peter Carman Burns (born 1966), University of Notre Dame, Notre Dame, Indiana Thompson ISI top ten most highly cited geoscientists (1996–2007)
Burtite: CaSn(OH)6 – American mining geologist Donald McLain Burt (born 1943)
Buseckite: (Fe,Zn,Mn)S – American geologist Peter R. Buseck, Arizona State University

C
Cabriite: Pd2SnCu – Canadian mineralogist Louis J. Cabri (born 1934)
Cámaraite: sorosilicate – Fernando Cámara (born 1967), mineralogist of Melilla, Spain
Cancrinite: Na6Ca2[(CO3)2 – Georg von Cancrin (1774–1845)
Canfieldite: Ag8SnS6 – American mining engineer Frederick Alexander Canfield (1849–1926)
Cannonite: Bi2(OH)2SO4 – American mineralogist and electron microprobe analyst Benjamin Bartlett (Bart) Cannon
Carlfriesite: CaTe4+2Te6+O8 – American researcher at the Institute of Geology of the National university of Mexico Carl Fries, Jr.
Carlhintzeite: Ca2AlF7 – German mineralogist Carl Hintze (1851–1916), University of Breslau
Carlosruizite: K6(Na,K)4Na6Mg10(SeO4)12(IO3)12 – Chilean geologist Carlos Ruiz Fuller (1916–1997), founder of the Chilean Geological Survey
Carnallite: KMgCl3 – Prussian mining engineer, Rudolf von Carnall (1804–1874)
Carnotite:  K2(UO2)2(VO4)2 – French mining engineer and chemist Marie Adolphe Carnot (1839–1920)
Cassidyite: Ca2Ni0.75Mg0.25(PO4)2 – American geologist William A. Cassidy
Castaingite (discredited 1967: a mixture of cuprian molybdenite and gerhardtite)
Caswellsilverite: NaCrS2 – American geologist, entrepreneur, and oilman Caswell Silver (1916–1988)
Cattiite: Mg3(PO4)2•22H2O – Michele Catti (b.  1945), Professor of Physical Chemistry, University of Milano-Bicocca, Italy
Celsian: BaAl2Si2O8 – Swedish astronomer and naturalist Anders Celsius (1701–1744)
And paracelsian
Cernyite: Cu2CdSnS4 – Canadian mineralogist Petr Cerny
Cesbronite: Cu6(TeO3)2(OH)6 – French mineralogist Fabian Cesbron
Chrisstanleyite: Ag2Pd3Se4 – British mineralogist Christopher John Stanley
Clarkeite:  – American mineral chemist and former chief chemist of the United States Geological Survey Frank Wigglesworth Clarke (1847–1931)
Cleveite (uraninite var.): UO2 • UO3 • PO • ThO2 –  Swedish chemist Per Teodor Cleve (1840–1905)
Clintonite: Ca(Mg,Al)3(Al3Si)O10(OH)2 – American statesman De Witt Clinton (1769–1828)
Coesite (form of SiO2): – American chemist Loring Coes, Jr. (1915–1978)
Coffinite: U(SiO4)1−x(OH)4x –  American geologist Reuben Clare Coffin
Cohenite:  – German mineralogist and petrographer Emil Cohen (1842–1905)
Colemanite: Ca2B6O11 – mine owner William T. Coleman (1824–1893)
Collinsite: Ca2Mg(PO4)2 – William Henry Collins (1878–1937), director of the Geological Survey of Canada
Columbite:  – Genoese explorer Christopher Columbus (c. 1451–1506)
 And manganocolumbite, ferrocolumbite, and Yttrocolumbite
Cooperite: (Pt,Pd,Ni)S – South African metallurgist Richard A. Cooper (1890–1972)
Cordierite: (Mg,Fe)2Al4Si5O18 to (Fe,Mg)2Al4Si5O18 – French geologist Louis Cordier (1777–1861)
Covellite: CuS – Italian mineralogist Niccolo Covelli (1790–1829)
Criddleite (2.LA.25)
Cronstedtite: (Fe2+,Fe3+)3(Si,Fe3+)2O5(OH)4 – Swedish mineralogist Axel Fredrik Cronstedt (1722–1765)
Crookesite:  – English chemist and physicist Sir William Crookes (1832–1919)

D
Dalyite: K2ZrSi6O15 – Reginald Aldworth Daly (1871–1957), Harvard University
Danalite: Be3Fe2+4(SiO4)3S – American geologist, mineralogist and zoologist James Dwight Dana (1813–1895)
Davinciite:  Na12K3Ca6Fe2+3Zr3 – Italian polymath Leonardo da Vinci (1452–1519 )
Davyne (9.FB.05)
Dawsonite: NaAlCO3(OH)2 – Canadian geologist Sir John William Dawson (1820–1899)
Deanesmithite: Hg+2Hg2+3Cr6+O5S2 – Deane K. Smith (1930–2001), professor of geosciences, Penn State University
Deerite: Fe2+6Fe3+3(Si6O17)O3(OH)5 – William Alexander Deer (1910–2009), mineralogist-petrologist, Cambridge University, Cambridge
Delafossite: CuFeO2 – French mineralogist Gabriel Delafosse (1796–1878)
Dellaite: Ca6(Si2O7)(SiO4)(OH)2 – geochemist, Della M. Roy (born 1926), spouse of Rustum Roy
Delrioite:  – Spanish–Mexican scientist and naturalist Andrés Manuel del Río (1764–1849)
And calciodelrioite
Descloizite: PbZnVO4(OH) – Alfred Lewis Oliver Legrand Des Cloizeaux (1817–1897), professor of mineralogy, University of Paris, Paris
And arsendescloizite
Dessauite-(Y)  – Italian mineralogist Gabor Dessau (1907–1983)
Dickite: Al2Si2O5(OH)4 – Scottish metallurgical chemist Allan Brugh Dick (1833–1926)
Djerfisherite:  or  – American mineralogist Daniel Jerome Fisher (1896–1988), professor at the University of Chicago 
Dollaseite-(Ce): CaCeMg2AlSi3O11F(OH) – American geologist Wayne A. Dollase (born 1938), geology professor at UCLA
Dolomite: CaMg(CO3)2 – French naturalist and geologist Déodat Gratet de Dolomieu (1750–1801)
Domeykite: Cu3As – Polish geologist, mineralogist and educator Ignacy Domeyko (1802–1889)
Donnayite: NaCaSr3Y(CO3)6 – Canadian professors J. D. H. Donnay and G. Donnay
Dumortierite: Al6.5-7BO3(SiO4)3(O,OH)3 –  French paleontologist Eugene Dumortier (1803–1873)
Davemaoite: Cubic CaSiO3–  Mineral physicist Ho-kwang Mao

E
Erikapohlite (IMA2010-090) – German collector of minerals Erika Pohl-Ströher (1919–2016)
Ernienickelite: NiMn3O7·3H2O – Canadian-Australian mineralogist Ernest (Ernie) H. Nickel (1925–2009)
Ernstburkeite: Mg(CH3SO3)2·12H2O – mineralogist Ernst A. J. Burke, former Head of the CNMNC (IMA)
Eskolaite: Cr2O3 – Finnish geologist Pentti Eelis Eskola (1883–1964)
Esperite: PbCa3Zn4(SiO4)4 – American petrologist Esper S. Larsen Jr. (1879–1961), Harvard University (Originally called calcium larsenite)
Evansite: Al3(PO4)(OH)6·6H2O – British nickel refiner, weapons manufacturer and geologist Brooke Evans (1797–1862)

F
Farringtonite: Mg3(PO4)2 – American geologist Oliver C. Farrington (1864-1933)
Ferberite: FeWO4 – German amateur mineralogist Moritz Rudolph Ferber (1805–1875)
Ferrierite: (Na,K)2Mg(Si,Al)18O36(OH) – Canadian geologist and mining engineer Walter Frederick Ferrier (1865–1950)
Ferri-obertiite: amphiboles – Italian mineralogist Roberta Oberti (born 1951)
And ferro-ferri-obertiite
Fergusonite: (Ce,La,Nd)NbO4 – British politician and mineral collector Robert Ferguson of Raith (1767–1840)
Ferraioloite (IMA2015-066)
Fleischerite: Pb3Ge(SO4)2(OH)6 – American mineralogist and geochemist Michael Fleischer (1908–1998) 
Fingerite: Cu11(VO4)6O2 – American mineralogist and crystallographer Larry W. Finger (born 1940)  
Foordite:  – American mineralogist Eugene Edward Foord (1946–1998)
Forsterite: Mg2SiO4 – German naturalist Johann Reinhold Forster (1729–1798)
Franckeite: Pb5Sn3Sb2S14 – mining engineers Carl Francke and Ernest Francke
Frankhawthorneite: Cu2Te6+O4(OH)2 – Frank C. Hawthorne (born 1946), University of Manitoba, Winnipeg Thompson ISI top ten most highly cited geoscientists (1996–2007)
Freieslebenite: AgPbSbS3 – Mining Commissioner of Saxony Johann Karl Freiesleben (1774–1846)
Friedrichite: Cu5Pb5Bi7S18 – Austrian geologist Othmar Michael Friedrich (1902–1991)
Fuchsite (variety of muscovite):  – German mineralogist and chemist Johann Nepomuk von Fuchs (1774–1856)</ref>

G
Gadolinite: (Ce,La,Nd,Y)2FeBe2Si2O10 – Finnish mineralogist and chemist Johan Gadolin (1760–1852)
Gagarinite series: Na(REExCa(1-x))(REEyCa(1-y))F6 – Russian cosmonaut Yuri Gagarin (1934–1968)
Gahnite: ZnAl2O4 – Swedish chemist Johan Gottlieb Gahn (1745–1818)
Gatehouseite: Mn2+5(PO4)2(OH)4 – crystal chemist Bryan M. K. C. Gatehouse (born 1932), Monash University, Melbourne 
Genkinite: (Pt,Pd)4Sb3 – Soviet mineralogist A. D. Genkin
Georgerobinsonite: Pb4(CrO4)2(OH)2FCl – George Willard Robinson
Gerhardtite:  – Alsatian chemist Charles Frédéric Gerhardt
Gibbsite: Al(OH)3 – American mineralogist George Gibbs (1777–1834)
Uintaite (syn. gilsonite, asphalt) – American Samuel H. Gilson
Ferri-ghoseite:  – Subrata Ghose (born 1932), emeritus professor at the University of Washington, Seattle
Goethite: FeOOH –  German polymath Johann Wolfgang von Goethe (1749–1832)
Julgoldite: sorosilicate – American mineralogist and geochemist Julian Royce Goldsmith (1918–1999)
Gormanite:  – mineralogist Donald Herbert Gorman, University of Toronto 
Gregoryite:  – British geologist and author John Walter Gregory (1864–1932). 
Greigite:  – mineralogist and physical chemist Joseph W. Greig (1895–1977).
Grossite:  – Israeli mineralogist and geologist Shulamit Gross (1923-2012) 
Grothite (titanite var., 9.AG.15)
Guettardite:  – French naturalist Jean-Étienne Guettard (1715–1786).
Grunerite: Fe7Si8O22(OH)2 – Swiss-French chemist Louis Gruner
Gunterite: Na4(H2O)16(H2V10O28) – American mineralogist Mickey Gunter
Gunningite: (Zn,Mn2+)SO4•H2O – Canadian geologist and academic Henry C. Gunning (1901–1991)

H
Haggertyite: Ba(Fe2+6Ti5Mg)O19 – American geophysicist Stephen E. Haggerty (born 1938)
Haidingerite: Ca(AsO3OH) – Austrian mineralogist Wilhelm Karl Ritter von Haidinger (1795–1871) 
Hambergite: Be2BO3OH – Swedish mineralogist Axel Hamberg (1863–1933)
Hapkeite: Fe2Si – American planetary scientist Bruce Hapke
Hausmannite: Mn2+Mn3+2O4 – Friedrich Ludwig Hausmann (1782–1859), professor of mineralogy, University of Göttingen, Göttingen
Hawleyite: CdS – Canadian mineralogist James Edwin Hawley (1897–1965)
Hazenite:  – Robert M. Hazen of the Carnegie Institute
Håleniusite-(La):  – Ulf Hålenius, director of the mineralogy department at the Swedish Museum of Natural History in Stockholm, Sweden.
Hauyne: Na3Ca(Si3Al3)O12(SO4) – French mineralogist René Just Haüy (1743–1822)
Heinrichite: Ba(UO2)2(AsO4)2 – mineralogist Eberhardt William Heinrich (1918–1991)
Hendricksite: KZn3(Si3Al)O10(OH)2 – American agriculturist Sterling B. Hendricks (1902–1981)
Herbertsmithite: ZnCu3(OH)6Cl2 – British mineralogist Herbert Smith (1872–1953)
Hessite: Ag2Te – Swiss-born Russian chemist Germain Henri Hess (1802–1850)
Heyite (identical with calderonite, 8.BG.05)
Heulandite series: (Ca,Na)2-3Al3(Al,Si)2Si13O36 – English mineral collector Henry Heuland (1778–1856)
Hiddenite (green variety of spodumene): – American geologist William Earl Hidden (1853–1918)
Högbomite (renamed to magnesiohögbomite-2N2S): (Al,Mg,Fe,Ti)22(O,OH)32  – Swedish geologist Arvid Högbom (1857–1940)
And ferrohögbomite-2N2S, magnesiohögbomite series and zincohögbomite series
Holmquistite:   – Swedish petrologist Per Johan Holmquist (1866–1946)
Holtite: (Ta0.6◻0.4)Al6BSi3O18(O,OH)2.25 – Harold Holt (1908–1967), prime minister of Australia
Howieite: inosilicate with 4-periodic single chain – Robert Andrew Howie (1923–2012), British petrologist and mineralogist of King's College, London University, London
Howlite: Ca2B5SiO9(OH)5 – Canadian chemist, mineralogist Henry How (1828–1879)
Hübnerite: MnWO4 – German mineralologist Adolf Huebner
Hurlbutite (8.AA.15)
Hutchinsonite: (Tl,Pb)2As5S9 – Cambridge mineralogist Arthur Hutchinson (1866–1937)
Huttonite: ThSiO4 – New Zealand-American mineralogist Colin Osborne Hutton (1910–1971)

J
Jarosewichite:  – American chemist Eugene Jarosewich
Jeanbandyite (4.FC.15)
Jimthompsonite: (Mg,Fe)5Si6O16(OH)2 – American mineralogist James Burleigh Thompson, Jr.
Johnbaumite: (Ca)5(AsO4)3(OH)  – American geologist and mineralogist John L. Baum 
Junitoite: CaZn2Si2O7·H2O – Jun Ito (1926–1978), mineralogist and crystallographer, University of Chicago

K
Karenwebberite: Na(Fe2+,Mn2+)PO4 – American geologist Karen L. Webber
Kassite: CaTi2O4(OH)2 – Russian geologist Nikolai Grigorievich Kassin (1885–1949)
Kampfite: Ba12(Si11Al5)O31(CO3)8Cl5 – Anthony Robert Kampf (born 1948)
Khomyakovite: Na12Ca6Sr3Fe3WZr3(Si25O73)(O,OH,H2O)3(Cl,OH)2 – Russian mineralogist Alexander Khomyakov (1933–2012)
Kieserite: MgSO4 – Dietrich Georg von Kieser (1779–1862), former president, Jena Academy
And cobaltkieserite
Kleberite: FeTi6O13 – German professor Will Kleber (1906–1970)
Kobellite: Pb22Cu4(Bi,Sb)30S69 –  German mineralogist Wolfgang Franz von Kobell (1803–1882)
Kochsandorite: CaAl2(CO3)2(OH)4H2O – Hungarian mineralogist Sándor Koch (1896–1983) 
Kogarkoite: Na3(SO4)F – Russian scientist Lia Nikolaevna Kogarko
Kolbeckite: ScPO4 – German mineralogist Friedrich L. W. Kolbeck
Kosnarite: Zr2(PO4)3 – after Richard Andrew "Rich" Kosnar (1946-2007), American mineral collector
 Kostovite: AuCuTe4 – Bulgarian mineralogist Ivan Kostov (1913–2004)
Krennerite: AuTe2 varying to (Au0.8,Ag0.2)Te2 – Hungarian mineralogist Joseph Krenner (1839–1920)
Krotite: CaAl2O4 – Russian-American cosmochemist Alexander N. Krot
Krut'aite: CuSe2 Czech mineralogist Tomas Krut'a (1906-1998)
Kukharenkoite-(Ce): Ba3CeF(CO3)3 – Russian mineralogist Alexander A. Kukharenko (1914–1993)
Kurnakovite: MgB3O3(OH)5 – Russian mineralogist and chemist Nikolai Semenovich Kurnakov (1860–1941)
Kunzite (variety of spodumene): – American mineralogist George Frederick Kunz (1856–1932)

L
Lacroixite: NaAl(PO4)F – French mineralogist Antoine François Alfred Lacroix (1863–1948)
Laueite (8.DC.30)
Lavinskyite: K(Li,Cu,Mg,Na)2Cu6(Si4O11)2(OH)4 – photographer of minerals Robert Lavinsky (Commons:Robert Lavinsky)
Lavoisierite: Mn2+8[Al10(Mn3+Mg)][Si11P]O44(OH)12 – French chemist Antoine-Laurent de Lavoisier (1743–1794)
Leakeite root name, sodium amphibole subgroup – British geologist Bernard E. Leake (born 1932), University of Glasgow
Minerals: ferri-fluoro-leakeite, ferri-leakeite, fluoro-leakeite, potassic-ferri-leakeite, potassic-leakeite, potassic-mangani-leakeite
Lemanskiite: NaCaCu5(AsO4)4Cl·5H2O – after Chester S. Lemanski, Jr. (b. 1947), American mineral collector
Liebauite: Ca3Cu5Si9O26 – German Friedrich Liebau (1926–2011), professor of mineralogy, University of Kiel.
Lipscombite: (Fe2+,Mn2+)(Fe3+)2(PO4)2(OH) – American chemist William Lipscomb (1919–2011)
And zinclipscombite
Livingstonite: HgSb4S8 – Scottish explorer in Africa David Livingstone (1813–1873)
Lonsdaleite: C – British crystallographer Kathleen Lonsdale (1903–1971)
Lorandite: TlAsS2 – Hungarian physicist Loránd Eötvös (1848–1919)
Lotharmeyerite:  – German chemist Julius Lothar Meyer (1830–1895)
And cobaltlotharmeyerite, ferrilotharmeyerite, manganlotharmeyerite, nickellotharmeyerite
Lucabindiite: (K,NH4)As4O6(Cl,Br) – Luca Bindi, professor of mineralogy and former head of the Division of Mineralogy of the Natural History Museum of the University of Florence (b. 1971)
Lukechangite-(Ce): Na3Ce2(CO3)4F – American mineralogist Luke L. Y. Chang (1934–2009)

M
Macdonaldite: BaCa4Si16O36(OH)2 – American volcanologist, Gordon Andrew Macdonald (1911–1978, redirect) 
Malhmoodite: FeZr(PO4)2 · 4H2O – Bertha K. Malhmood, for many years Administrative Assistant of the Branch of Analytical Laboratories, U.S. Geological Survey
Mandarinoite: Fe2(SeO3)3·4H2O – American-Canadian mineralogist Joseph (Joe) A. Mandarino (1929–2007)
And telluromandarinoite
Maricite: NaFePO4 – Croatian mineralogist Luka Marić (1899–1979), University of Zagreb
Machatschkiite (8.CJ.35)
Mascagnite: (NH4)2SO4 – Italian anatomist Paolo Mascagni (1752–1815)
Mathesiusite: K5(UO2)4(SO4)4(VO5)·4(H2O) – German minister Johannes Mathesius (1504–1565)
Mckelveyite-(Y): Ba3NaCa0.75U0.25Y(CO3)6 – American geologist Vincent E. McKelvey (1916–1985)
Meyerhofferite: CaB3O3(OH)5·H2O – German chemist, Wilhelm Meyerhoffer (1864–1906)
Meyrowitzite: Ca(UO2)(CO3)2·5H2O  – after Robert Meyrowitz (1916-2013), an American analytical chemist
Mendeleevite-(Ce): Cs6(Ce22Ca6)(Si70O175)(OH,F)14(H2O)21 – Russian chemist Dmitri Ivanovich Mendeleev (1834–1907)
Menzerite-(Y) (IMA2009-050)
Millerite: NiS – British mineralogist William Hallowes Miller (1801–1880)
Millosevichite: Al2(SO4)3 – Italian mineralogist Federico Millosevich (1875–1942)
Moëloite (2.HC.25)
Mohsite (crichtonite var., 4.CC.40)
Moissanite: SiC (naturally occurring) – discoverer Henri Moissan (1852–1907)
Monticellite: Ca(Mg,Fe)SiO4 – Italian mineralogist Teodoro Monticelli (1759–1845)
Morganite (variety of Beryl): – American financier J. P. Morgan (1837–1913)
Mozartite: CaMn3+SiO4(OH) – Wolfgang Amadeus Mozart (1756–1791)
Murdochite: PbCu6O8−x(Cl,Br)2x – American mineralogist Joseph Murdoch (1890–1973)

N
Nataliakulikite: Ca4Ti2(Fe3+,Fe2+)(Si,Fe3+,Al)O11 – Russian mineralogist Natalia Artyemovna Kulik (1933 - )
Nasonite: Pb6Ca4(Si2O7)3Cl2 – American mining engineer and author Frank Lewis Nason (1856–1928)
Norrishite: KLiMn3+2(Si4O10)O2 – Australian geologist Keith Norrish (1924-2017), pioneer of wavelength-dispersive X-ray fluorescence analysis
Nikischerite: Fe2+6Al3(OH)18[Na(H2O)6][SO4]2·6H2O – American mineralogist Anthony J. Nikischer (born 1949)

O
Obertiite amphibole root name (9.DE.25)
Okenite: CaSi2O5·2H2O – German naturalist Lorenz Oken (1779–1851)

P
Pääkkönenite: Sb2AsS2 – Finnish geologist Viekko Pääkkönen (1907–1980)
Pabstite: BaSnSi3O9 – Adolf Pabst (1899–1990), professor of mineralogy, University of California, Berkeley
Partheite:  Ca2Al4Si4O15(OH)2·4H2O – Swiss crystallographer Erwin Parthé (1928–2006)
Paulingite series, zeolites – Linus Carl Pauling (1901–1994), professor of chemistry, California Institute of Technology
Paulingite-Ca and paulingite-K
Paulscherrerite: UO2(OH)2 – Swiss physicist Paul Scherrer (1890–1969)
Penikisite:  BaMg2Al2(PO4)3(OH)3 – Canadian explorer Gunar Penikis (1936–1979)
Perhamite:  Ca3Al7(SiO4)3(PO4)4(OH)3·16.5(H2O) – American geologist and pegmatite miner Frank C. Perham (born 1934)
Perite:  PbBiO2Cl – Swedish geologist Per Adolf Geijer (1886–1976)
Perovskite:  CaTiO3 – Russian mineralogist L. A. Perovski (1792–1856)
Perroudite (2.FC.20c)
Petzite (1845):  Ag3AuTe2 – chemist W. Petz
Pezzottaite:  Cs(Be2Li)Al2Si6O18 – Italian geologist and mineralogist Federico Pezzotta
Phillipsite:  (Ca,Na2,K2)3Al6Si10O32·12H2O – English mineralogist and geologist William Phillips (1775–1828)
Prehnite:  Ca2Al(AlSi3O10)(OH)2 – Dutch governor Colonel Hendrik Von Prehn
Priscillagrewite-(Y): (Ca2Y)Zr2Al3O12 – American geologist Priscilla Croswell Perkins Grew (1940 - )
Proustite:  Ag3AsS3 – French chemist Joseph Louis Proust (1754–1826)
Putnisite: SrCa4Cr83+(CO3)8(SO4)(OH)16·25H2O – mineralogists Andrew and Christine Putnis

R
Ramanite homologous series (6.EA.10)
Rambergite:  MnS – mineralogist Hans Ramberg (1917–1998)
Rammelsbergite: NiAs2 – Karl Friedrich August Rammelsberg (1813–1899)
Ramdohrite (2.JB.40a)
Riebeckite:  Na2(Fe,Mg)5Si8O22(OH)2 – German explorer Emil Riebeck (1853–1885)
Rittmannite: jahnsite-whiteite group – Swiss volcanologist Alfred Rittmann (1893–1980)
Roeblingite (9.CB.05)
Roselite: Ca2(Co2+, Mg)[AsO4]2·H2O – German mineralogist Gustav Rose (1798–1873)
Rosenbuschite (9.BE.22)
Rossmanite:  (LiAl2)Al6Si6O18(BO3)3(OH)4 – Caltech mineralogist George R. Rossman
Rruffite (8.CG.10)
Russellite:  (BiO2)WO4 – British mineralogist Arthur Russell
Rustumite: Ca10(Si2O7)2(SiO4)(OH)2Cl2 – American material scientist, Rustum Roy (1924–2010)

S
Saleeite: Mg(UO2)2(PO4)2·10H2O – Belgian mineralogist Achille Salée (1883–1932)
Samarskite: Y0.2REE0.3Fe3+0.3U0.2Nb0.8Ta0.2O4 – Russian official Vasili Samarsky-Bykhovets (1803–1870)
Sanbornite: BaSi2O5 – American mineralogist Frank B. Sanborn (1862–1936)
Satterlyite: (Fe++,Mg)2(PO4)(OH) – Canadian geologist Jack Satterly (born 1906)
Scheelite: CaWO4 – German-Swedish pharmaceutical chemist Carl Wilhelm Scheele (1742–1786)
Shcherbinaite: VO5 – Soviet geologist Vladimir Shcherbina (1907–1978)
Scheuchzerite (9.DM.35)
Schoenfliesite (4.FC.10)
Schoepite: (UO2)8O(OH)12·12H2O – Alfred Schoep (1881–1966), professor of mineralogy at the University of Ghent
Schreibersite: (Fe,Ni)3P – Austrian naturalist Carl Franz Anton Ritter von Schreibers (1775–1852)
Schreyerite: V2Ti3O9 – German mineralogist Werner Schreyer (1930–2006)
Schröckingerite: NaCa3(UO2) – Julius Freiherr Schröckinger von Neudenberg (1814–1882)
Scottyite: BaCu2Si2O7 – Michael Scott (born 1945), first CEO of Apple and significant sponsor of the Rruff project 
Seamanite: Mn3[B(OH)4](PO4)(OH)2 – Arthur Edmund Seaman (1858–1937)
Segnitite: PbFe3H(AsO4)2(OH)6 – after Australian mineralogist, gemologist and petrologist Edgar Ralph Segnit (1923–1999)
Sekaninaite: (Fe+2,Mg)2Al4Si5O18 – Czech mineralogist Josef Sekanina (born 1901)
Sellaite: MgF2 – Italian politician and mineralogist Quintino Sella (1827-1884)
Senarmontite: Sb2O3 – French mineralogist and physician Henri Hureau de Sénarmont (1808–1862)
Sengierite: Cu2(OH)2[UO2|VO4]2·6H2O – Belgian UMHK director Edgar Sengier (1879–1963)
Shulamitite: Ca3TiFe3+AlO8 – Israeli mineralogist and geologist Shulamit Gross (1923-2012)
Sillimanite: Al2SiO5 – American chemist Benjamin Silliman (1779–1864)
Simpsonite:  Al4(Ta,Nb)3O13(OH) – Australian mineralogist Edward Sydney Simpson (1875–1939)
Smithsonite: ZnCO3 – British chemist and mineralogist, James Smithson (1754–1829)
Sorbyite (2.LB.30)
Sperrylite: PtAs2 – American chemist Francis Louis Sperry
Steacyite:  K0.3(Ca,Na)2ThSi8O20 – Canadian mineralogist Harold Robert Steacy (born 1923)
Stenonite: Sr2Al(CO3)F5 – Danish physician Nicolaus Steno (Niels Steensen) (1638–1686)
Stephanite: Ag5SbS4 – Archduke Stephan of Austria (1817–1867)
Stichtite: Mg6Cr2CO3(OH)16·4H2O – American born Australian mine manager Robert Carl Sticht (1857–1922)
Stilleite: ZnSe – German geologist Hans Stille (1876–1966)
Stolzite: PbWO4 – Czechoslovakian Joseph Alexi Stolz (1803–1896)
Strashimirite:  Cu8(AsO4)4(OH)4·5H2O – Bulgarian petrographer and mineralogist Strashimir Dimitrov (1892–1960)
Stromeyerite:  AgCuS – German chemist, Friedrich Stromeyer (1776–1835)
Strunzite:  Mn2+Fe3+2(PO4)2(OH)2·6H2O – German mineralogist Karl Hugo Strunz (1910–2006)
And ferristrunzite, ferrostrunzite
Stumpflite: Pt(Sb,Bi) – Austrian professor of mineralogy Eugen Friedrich Stumpfl (1931–2004)
Sugilite:  KNa2(Fe,Mn,Al)2Li3Si12O30 – Japanese petrologist Ken-ichi Sugi (1901–1948)
Svanbergite: SrAl3(PO4)(SO4)(OH)6 – Swedish chemist Lars Fredrik Svanberg (1805–1878)
Swedenborgite:  NaBe4Sb5+O7 – Swedish scientist and theologian Emanuel Swedenborg (1688–1772)
Sweetite:  Zn(OH)2 – Curator of mineral department of the British Museum, Jessie Sweet (1901–1979)
Sylvite:  KCl  – Dutch chemist Franciscus Sylvius (1614–1672)

T

Tarbuttite: Zn2(PO4)(OH) Percy Coventry Tarbutt (died 1943), a Director of the Broken Hill Exploration Company
Teallite:  PbSnS2 – British geologist Jethro Justinian Harris Teall (1849–1924)
Tennantite:  Cu12As4S13 – English chemist Smithson Tennant  (1761–1815)
Tenorite:  CuO – Italian botanist Michele Tenore (1780–1861)
Theophrastite: Ni(OH)2 – Greek philosopher and writer Theophrastus (c. 371 – c. 287 BC)
Thomasclarkite:  Na0.8Ce0.2Y0.5REE0.7(HCO3)(OH)3·4H2O – Canadian geologist Thomas Clark (1893–1996)
Thortveitite:  (Sc,Y)2Si2O7 – Norwegian engineer Olaus Thortveit
Tiemannite:  HgSe – Johann Carl Wilhelm Tiemann (1848–1899)
Torbernite:  CuAl(UO2)2(PO4)2·8-12H2O – Swedish chemist Torbern Bergman (1735–1784)
Trevorite:  NiFe2O4 – Major Tudor Gruffydd Trevor, mining inspector for the Pretoria District, Transvaal, South Africa
Tschernichite:  – Rudy W. Tschernich (born 1945), expert on zeolites 
Tschermakite:  – Austrian mineralogist Gustav Tschermak von Seysenegg (1836–1927)

U
Ulexite:  NaCaB5O9·8H2O – German chemist George Ludwig Ulex (1811–1883) 
Ullmannite:  NiSbS – German chemist and mineralogist Johann Christoph Ullmann (1771–1821, redirect)
Uytenbogaardtite:  Ag3AuS2 – Dutch mineralogist Willem Uytenbogaardt (1918–2012)
Uvarovite:  Ca3Cr2(SiO4)3 – Russian Count Sergei Semenovitch Uvarov (1765–1855)

V
Valentinite:  Sb2O3 – German alchemist Basilius Valentinus (might be Johann Thölde? 1565–1614)
Vanthoffite: Na6Mg(SO4)4 – Jacobus Henricus van't Hoff (1852–1911), professor of chemistry
Vaterite:  CaCO3 – German mineralogist Heinrich Vater (1859–1930)
Vernadite (4.FE.40)
Veszelyite: (Cu,Zn)2Zn(PO4)(OH)3·2H2O – Ágost Veszely (1821–1879), Hungarian mining engineer
Vincentite: (Pd,Pt)3(As,Sb,Te) – Ewart Albert "David" Vincent (1919–2012), mineralogist at Durham College and Oxford University (UK) and chair of Geology at Manchester University (UK). 
Vivianite:  Fe3(PO4)2·8H2O – English mineralogist John Henry Vivian (1785–1855)
And metavivianite
Vladermaritre: President of the Republic of Russia

W
Wardite:  NaAl3(PO4)2(OH)4·2H2O – American naturalist Henry Augustus Ward (1834–1906)
Warikahnite:  Zn3(AsO4)2·2H2O – German mineral collector Walter Richard Kahn (born 1911)
Weeksite: K2(UO2)2Si6O15·4H2O – USGS mineralogist Alice Mary Dowse Weeks (1909–1988)
Weloganite:  Na2(Sr,Ca)3Zr(CO3)6·3H2O – Canadian geologist William Edmond Logan (1798–1875)
Wendwilsonite: Ca2Mg(AsO4)2·2H2O – Wendell E. Wilson (born 1946), Mineralogical Record, editor and publisher.
Wernerite (intermediate member of the marialite-meionite series)
Whewellite:  CaC2O4·H2O – English mineralogist William Whewell (1794–1866)
Whiteite series: XM(1)M(2)Al2(PO4)4(OH)2·8H2O – John Sampson White, Jr. (born 1933), Mineralogical Record, editor and publisher.
Whitlockite:  Ca3(PO4)2 – American mineralogist Herbert Percy Whitlock (1868–1948)
Willemite:  Zn2SiO4 – William I of the Netherlands (1772–1843)
Witherite:  BaCO3 – English physician and naturalist William Withering (1741–1799)
Wollastonite:  CaSiO3 – English chemist and mineralogist William Hyde Wollaston (1766–1828)
Woodhouseite:  CaAl3(SO4)(PO4)(OH)6 – Charles Douglas Woodhouse (1888–1975), an American mineralogist.
Wulfenite:  PbMoO4 – Austrian mineralogist Franz Xaver von Wulfen (1728–1805)
Wulffite: K3NaCu4O2(SO4)4 – Russian crystallographer George (Yuri Viktorovich) Wulff (1863-1925)
Wyartite: ·7H2O – Jean Wyart (1902–1992), mineralogist at the Sorbonne

Y
Yangite: PbMnSi3O8·H2O – Hexiong Yang, Mineralogy researcher at the Department of Geosciences, University of Arizona

Z
Zaccagnaite: Zn4Al2CO3(OH)12·3H2O – Italian geologist and mineral collector Domenico Zaccagna (1851–1940)
Zaherite:  Al12(OH)26(SO4)5·20H2O – Bangladeshi geologist M. A. Zaher
Zajacite-(Ce):  Na(REExCa1−x)(REEyCa1−y)F6 – Explorer Ihor Stephan Zajac (born 1935)
Zakharovite:  Na4Mn5Si10O20(OH)6·6H2O – Russian Director of the Moscow Institute of Geological Exploration Evgeii Evgen'evich Zakharov (1902–1980)
Zanazziite: Ca2(MgFe)(MgFeMnAl)4Be(OH)4(PO4)6·6H2O – Italian Professor Pier Francesco Zanazzi (born 30 April 1939)
Zaratite:  Ni3CO3(OH)4·4(H2O) – Spanish diplomat and dramatist Antonio Gil y Zárate (1793–1861)
Zavaritskite: (BiO)F – Soviet geologist and petrographer Alexander Nikolaevich Zavaritsky (1884–1952)
Zektzerite:  LiNa(Zr,Ti,Hf)Si6O15 – American mathematician and mineral collector Jack Zektzer (born 1936)
Zeunerite: Cu(UO2)2(AsO4)2•(10-16)H2O – German physicist, engineer and epistemologist Gustav Anton Zeuner (1828–1907)
Zhanghengite:  CuZn – ancient Chinese astronomer Zhang Heng (78–139)
Zhemchuzhnikovite:  NaMgAl(C2O4)3·8H2O – Russian clay mineralogist Yury Zhemchuzhnikov (1885–1957)
Ziesite:  βCu2V2O7 – mineralogist Emanuel George Zies
Zigrasite:   MgZr(PO4)2(H2O)4 – American mineral collector James Zigras
Zinkenite: Pb9Sb22S42 – German mineralogist and mining geologist, Johann Karl Ludwig Zinken (1790–1862)
Zippeite: (UO2)6(SO4)3(OH)10·4H2O – Austrian mineralogist Franz Xaver Maximilian Zippe
Zirkelite: (Ca,Th,Ce)Zr(Ti,Nb)2O7 – German petrographer Ferdinand Zirkel (1838–1912)
Zoisite:  Ca2(Al.OH)Al2(SiO4)3 – Carniolan scientist Sigmund Zois (1747–1819)
Zussmanite:  K(Fe2+,Mg,Mn)13[AlSi17O42](OH)14 – British geologist Jack Zussman (born 1924)
Zykaite:  Fe3+4(AsO4)3(SO4)(OH)·15H2O – Czech geochemist Vacklav Zyka

See also
 Mineralogy
 Mineraloid
 List of minerals recognized by the International Mineralogical Association
 List of minerals
 Eponym
 Lists of etymologies
 List of eponyms

Notes

References
 mindat.org The Mineral Database
 Webmineral.com
 Minerals Named After People and Places
 American Mineralogist- New Mineral Names 1979

Geology-related lists
Lists of eponyms
Mineralogy